Hardcore Heaven was a professional wrestling event produced by Eastern/Extreme Championship Wrestling (ECW). It took place annually from 1994 to 2000, with the exception of 1998. The 1997, 1999 and 2000 iterations aired on pay-per-view. The footage from the six Hardcore Heaven events is owned by WWE.

Dates, venues and main events

References

External links
 
 

 
Recurring events established in 1994
Recurring events disestablished in 2000